Dactylastele nevilli is a species of sea snail, a marine gastropod mollusk in the family Calliostomatidae.

Description

Distribution

References

Notes
 Petit R.E. (2009) George Brettingham Sowerby, I, II & III: their conchological publications and molluscan taxa. Zootaxa 2189: 1–218

nevilli
Gastropods described in 1905